Multiple Intelligence International School (MIIS) is an international co-educational day and progressive school. The Main Campus of MIIS is located in Loyola Heights, Quezon City, and the Upper School campus is located along Katipunan Avenue, Quezon City, Philippines.

History 
The Multiple Intelligence International School was first established as Child's Place Preschool in 1996, by Mary Joy Canon-Abaquin.

It is the first educational institution in the Philippines that has based its approach on the multiple intelligence framework of Harvard-based cognitive psychologist, Howard Gardner.

Child's Place is the preschool department of MIIS that caters to the Preschool Child from 2 to 5 years. The Multiple Intelligence International School (Grades 1-8) was founded to serve Lower and Middle School students. MIIS Upper School (Grades 9-12), was founded in 2007.

In 2012, music researcher Pamela Costes-Onishi conducted a study that evaluated MIIS' Music Education curriculum with that of the Department of Education and found that it had distinct differences in approach and pedagogy.

In 2016, MIIS celebrated their 20th founding anniversary.

Academics and Curriculum 
MIIS does not conform to traditional modes of Philippine education. Following Howard Gardner's Multiple Intelligences Theory, MIIS focuses on eight intelligences among their students.

The K-12 program covers 6 years of primary education, four years of Junior High School, and two years of Senior High School. MIIS is aligned with the Philippine Department of Education standards for the enhanced K-12 program.

The school has been acknowledged as a leader in youth entrepreneurship in the Philippines.

On September 23, 2019, MIIS partnered with Smart Communications to hold the Youth Innovation Challenge, at the Philippine International Convention Center.

Campuses 
MIIS is located in two campuses in Loyola Heights, Quezon City, near Ateneo de Manila University and the University of the Philippines Diliman. The Main Campus, located in Escaler Street, Loyola Heights, Quezon City, houses the Child's Place Preschool and Lower and Middle School. The Upper School is located at Elizabeth Hall, Katipunan Avenue, Quezon City.

Council of International Schools Accreditation 
In 2018, MIIS was given accreditation by the Council of International Schools. MIIS was the fourth international school in the Philippines to attain CIS accreditation at the time.

References

External links 
Multiple Intelligence International School

Educational institutions established in 1996
International schools in Metro Manila
Schools in Quezon City
1996 establishments in the Philippines